Andrea Gerzsényi (born 23 May 1991, in Gyula) is a former Hungarian handballer.

Achievements
Magyar Kupa:
Silver Medalist: 2012
Bronze Medalist: 2010

References

External links
Andrea Gerzsényi career statistics at Worldhandball
Andrea Gerzsényi player profile on Békéscsabai Előre NKSE Official Website

1991 births
Living people
People from Gyula
Hungarian female handball players
Békéscsabai Előre NKSE players
Sportspeople from Békés County